Subarnesvara Siva temple is situated on the left bank of Lingaraja west canal, Bhubaneswar, Orissa, India. The east facing ancient temple enshrines a Siva lingam within a circular yoni pitha in the sanctum measuring 2.35 square meters. 

There is  also a Sahasra Lingam in the south-eastern region of the temple. The other minor structures are an amalaka, octagonal Lingam and ornamental block of stone, carved with the image of goddess Tarini.

Etymology 
The temple derives its name from the settlements of goldsmith who have historically lived around the Shiva temple. The name Subarnesvara is the vernacular rendition and derives itself from the root Sanskrit word "स्वर्ण " (swarna) meaing gold.

History 
The temple was established approximately in 10th century CE during the Somavaṃshi rule in the region. Architectural features and scheme of decoration including the building material bears strong resemblance with other 10th century temples of Bhubaneswar.

Significance 
This temple holds as an important reference to the Somavamshis who were said, by locals, to have built the temple. Various festivals and occasions like Shivaratri, Sankranti, and Chaturdashi are observed at the temple.

Orientation and Surroundings 
Surrounding: The temple is surrounded by the approaching road on the east, Lingaraja west canal and paddy fields in south, Nageshvara temple across the canal in the west and residential buildings in north.

Orientation: The temple faces East.

Architectural features 
The temple stands over a low pedestal measuring 6.90 meters in length, 6.30 meters in width and 0.23 meters in height. Architecturally the temple is pancharatha with a square vimana and the front porch extending towards east. The vimana measures 5.45 square meters and the frontal porch 0.50 meters. On elevation, the temple is in rekha order measuring 11.58 meters in height from khura to kalasa with usual bada, gandi and mastaka. The bada measuring 3.48 meters in height has five vertical divisions namely pabhaga with four mouldings (0.92 meters), talajangha (0.86 meters), bandhana of single moulding (0.20 meters), upara jangha (0.75 meters) and the baranda with four mouldings (0.75 meters). The gandi above the baranda measuring 6.10 meters in height is distinguished by a central raha and a pair of anuratha and kanika pagas on either side of the raha, which is a curvilinear spire, and devoid of ornamentation. The mastaka as usual in Orissan temples has components like beki, amlaka, khapuri and kalasa that measures 2.00 meters in height.

Parsva devatas 
The parsvadevata niches are located on the raha paga of the talajangha on three sides of north, west and south measures 1 meter in height, 0.53 meters in width and 0.38 meters in depth are devoid of ornamentation.

Decorative features 
The base of the gandi is decorated with a series of miniature
rekha deul as angasikharas on the pagas arranged in descending order from raha to the
kanika paga. The baranda moudings above the raha niche are relieved by chaitya motifs. Both the upara and tala jangha are decorated with a series of pilaster motifs in relief udyota
simha finds place on the raha paga of the eastern wall
doorjamb, except the dvarapala niches at the base the doorjamb are
of recent additions made of plain sand stones. The doorjambs measure 2.20 meters in height
and 1.60 meters in width. The dvarapala niches house Saivite dvarapalas holding trident in their left hand along with river goddess standing on their respective mounts. Yamuna in the right niche is provided with a parasol held by a diminutive female attendant. While the niches are crowned by stylized chaitya motifs at the top, beneath are figures of gaja kranta Lintel- The architrave above the doorjambs measuring 1.8 meters is carved with navagrahas, each housed in a niche. They are all seated in padmasana except
Rahu and Ketu. The grahas are flanked by two atlantid ganas on both ends of the architrave.

Current state and condition 
Signs of distress are noticed - cracks on the roof and outer wall of the temple are significant.

Since the sanctum (cella) is 1.20 meters below the present ground level, there is seepage of water from the adjoining west canal during monsoon and heavy rains. The overflow of the adjoining west canal during rains leads to underground water stagnating inside the garbha griha that is weakening the temple foundation.

See also
 List of temples in Bhubaneswar

References

Further reading 
 Lesser Known Monuments of Bhubaneswar by Dr. Sadasiba Pradhan
 http://wikimapia.org/12002188/Subaneswar-Shiv-Temple-by-Srikant-Sahoo-Sirapur-Pranabandhu-Sahoo

Hindu temples in Bhubaneswar